John Harold Cooper (born July 2, 1937) is a former American football player and coach. Cooper was an assistant coach at Iowa State, Oregon State, UCLA, Kansas, and Kentucky. Then, he embarked on a head coaching career, as he served as the head coach at the University of Tulsa (1977–1984), Arizona State University (1985–1987), and Ohio State University (1988–2000), compiling a career record of 192–84–6. Cooper was inducted into the College Football Hall of Fame as a coach in 2008.

Early years and playing career
Cooper was born and raised in the Knoxville suburb of Powell, Tennessee. He graduated from Powell High School in 1955, then served in the United States Army for two years. After serving for two years, he enrolled at Iowa State University, where he played football for legendary coach Clay Stapleton in the single-wing formation with the Iowa State Cyclones, including the 1959 "Dirty 30" team. As a senior in 1961, Cooper was team captain and MVP. Cooper graduated from Iowa State in 1962 with a bachelor's degree in physical education.

Coaching career
Cooper began his coaching career in 1962 as the freshmen team coach at Iowa State. He then was an assistant coach at Oregon State from 1963 to 1964 under Tommy Prothro and helped Oregon State finish first place in the Athletic Association of Western Universities (AAWU) in 1964. Oregon State also made the Rose Bowl and finished #8 in the final AP Poll. Cooper then followed Prothro to UCLA to be an assistant there from 1965 to 1966. In the 1965 season, UCLA finished first in the AAWU and #4 in the final AP Poll and won the Rose Bowl. The 1966 UCLA team finished #5 in the AP Poll.

In 1967, Cooper became defensive coordinator at Kansas under Pepper Rodgers. Cooper again was part of a conference championship team in 1968 when Kansas finished first in the Big 12. The 1968 Kansas team finished #9 in the final AP Poll and made the Orange Bowl. Cooper remained at Kansas until 1971. From 1972 to 1976, Cooper had his final assistant position at Kentucky, first under John Ray in 1972 then Fran Curci from 1973 to 1976. In Cooper's final season at Kentucky in 1976, Kentucky finished #18 in the AP Poll and won the Peach Bowl.

In 1977, he was named the head football coach at the University of Tulsa. At Tulsa, he compiled a 56–32 record with five Missouri Valley Conference titles. Cooper considers his tenure at Tulsa his "most enjoyable years as a coach". He became the head coach at Arizona State in 1985 where his teams played in three consecutive bowl games, including the 1987 Rose Bowl, during his three-year tenure. His record was 0–2–1 against arch-rival Arizona. He accepted the job as head coach at Ohio State on December 31, 1987.

Cooper's first season in Columbus was somewhat undistinguished; the Buckeyes notched their first losing season since 1966. However, he quickly turned the Buckeyes around and led them to shared Big Ten titles in 1993, 1996, and 1998. In his 13 seasons at Ohio State, Cooper compiled a 111–43–4 record; his 111 victories are second in Ohio State history behind only Woody Hayes's 205. Among his most memorable victories at Ohio State were back-to-back victories against Notre Dame (1995 and 1996), leading Ohio State to its first Rose Bowl in 13 years (the 1997 Rose Bowl—a win over Arizona State), and a 1999 Sugar Bowl victory over Texas A&M. Cooper's teams at Ohio State were loaded with a great deal of talent that would go on to play in the NFL, including: 1995 Heisman Trophy winner Eddie George, 1995 Fred Biletnikoff Award winner Terry Glenn, 1996 Outland Trophy winner Orlando Pace, 1998 Jim Thorpe Award winner Antoine Winfield, as well as Alonzo Spellman, Robert Smith, Dan Wilkinson, Joey Galloway, Rickey Dudley, Mike Vrabel, Korey Stringer, David Boston, Shawn Springs, Ahmed Plummer, Na'il Diggs, Nate Clements, and Ryan Pickett.

However, Cooper has also been remembered for his 3–8 bowl record and his 2–10–1 record against archrival Michigan. His most disappointing losses to the Wolverines came in 1993, 1995, and 1996. In each season of those seasons, Ohio State entered the Michigan game undefeated and ranked in the top five, but were upset by the Wolverines on each occasion; two of those losses cost the Buckeyes a Rose Bowl bid. In 1993 Ohio State was ranked #5 and undefeated, needing only to beat Michigan to get their first trip to Pasadena in nine years. However, they were shut out by the unranked Wolverines 28–0 in Ann Arbor. In 1995 Ohio State lost a #2 ranking, the Big Ten title, and another shot at the Rose Bowl by losing to the #18 ranked Wolverines, 31–23, in Ann Arbor. In 1996, the Buckeyes were again ranked #2 and had already secured a Rose Bowl berth when they faced #21 ranked Michigan, this time in Columbus. The Buckeyes smelled victory after shutting out the Wolverines in the first half, but Michigan rallied in the second half to upset the Buckeyes yet again, 13–9, costing them a chance at the national championship. Ohio State would go on to win the 1996 Rose Bowl against Arizona State and finish the season ranked #2. With this victory, Cooper became the first coach to win the Rose Bowl with a Pac-10 and a Big Ten team.

In 1997, top ranked Michigan entered the game undefeated and #4 Ohio State had the opportunity to spoil Michigan's perfect season; however, the Wolverines again defeated the Buckeyes, 20–14. To add insult to injury, Michigan's win was highlighted by the performance of Ohio native and 1997 Heisman Trophy winner Charles Woodson, who made game changing plays on offense, defense, and special teams.

In 1998, Ohio State was 8–0 and ranked #1 in the country but was upset by Michigan State, 28–24. They did go on to beat Michigan that season and won the Sugar Bowl over Texas A&M, 24–14, eventually finishing #2 in the polls.

Cooper's Buckeyes were expected to have a strong season in 1999, but slumped to 6–6, their first non-winning record since Cooper's first year and only their third since 1947. They rebounded to 8–4 a year later, but a 38–26 loss to Michigan cost Cooper his job at the end of the season. He was the first non-interim Buckeye head coach since Wes Fesler, Hayes' predecessor, to have left Ohio State without winning an outright Big Ten title.

Later life and honors
Cooper currently works for the Cincinnati Bengals of the NFL as a scouting consultant and also works as a college football analyst for ESPN.

On May 1, 2008, Cooper was elected to the College Football Hall of Fame. He was inducted into the Rose Bowl Hall of Fame on December 30, 2012, representing both Arizona State and Ohio State football teams. On September 8, 2014, Cooper was inducted into the Iowa State University Athletics Hall of Fame in an on-field ceremony during the Iowa State-Kansas State football game.

Head coaching record

See also
 Legends Poll
 List of presidents of the American Football Coaches Association

References

External links
 
 Ohio State biography of Cooper (archived from 2000)

1937 births
Living people
American football defensive backs
American football running backs
Arizona State Sun Devils football coaches
Iowa State Cyclones football coaches
Iowa State Cyclones football players
Kansas Jayhawks football coaches
Kentucky Wildcats football coaches
Ohio State Buckeyes football coaches
Oregon State Beavers football coaches
Tulsa Golden Hurricane athletic directors
Tulsa Golden Hurricane football coaches
UCLA Bruins football coaches
College Football Hall of Fame inductees
United States Army soldiers
Sportspeople from Knoxville, Tennessee
People from Knox County, Tennessee
Coaches of American football from Tennessee
Players of American football from Knoxville, Tennessee